Yengišan (1694 – 1771) was a Manchu official of the Qing dynasty, who was part of the Bordered Yellow Banner. He served various official positions during the Qing dynasty. His father is Yentai (尹泰).

References 
 

1694 births
1771 deaths
Grand Councillors of the Qing dynasty
Grand Secretaries of the Qing dynasty
Assistant Grand Secretaries
Viceroys of Southern Rivers
Viceroys of Liangjiang
Viceroys of Liangguang
Viceroys of Yun-Gui
Viceroys of Sichuan
Viceroys of Shaan-Gan
Manchu Bordered Yellow Bannermen